Aripeka Sandhills Preserve is a protected area of  west of US 19 near Aripeka and Hudson, Florida. It is managed by the Southwest Florida Water Management District and was purchased on November 8, 2007, as part of the  Weeki Wachee Preserve (now more than ). It is part of a group of conservation lands extending north to the Crystal River Buffer Preserve (now a Florida State Park), helping preserve the southernmost coastal hardwood hammock in western Florida. The preserve includes dense hardwood swamps and piney sandhills. It is located at 18000 Aripeka Road.

References

External links
Aripeka Sandhills Preserve trail map
Aripeka Sandhills Preserve area map

Protected areas of Pasco County, Florida
Nature reserves in Florida
Southwest Florida Water Management District reserves